Ilam district is one of 14 districts of Koshi Province of eastern Nepal. The 2011 census counted 290,254 population.

Ilam attracts many researchers and scientists for the study of medicinal and aromatic plants, orchids, rare birds and the red panda. Ilam stretches from the Terai belt to the upper hilly belt of this Himalayan nation.

Etymology

The name Ilam is derived from the limbu language in which "IL" means twisted and "Lam" means road. Ilam was one of the ten self ruling states of Limbuwan before the reunification of Nepal. Its ruler, King Hangshu Phuba Lingdom of Lingdom dynasty, ruled Ilam as a confederate state of Limbuwan until 1813 AD. The treaty between the other Limbuwan states and the King of Gorkha (Gorkha-Limbuwan Treaty of 1774 AD), and the conflict of Gorkha and Sikkim, led to the unification of Ilam with Gorkha. Ilam was the last of the ten kingdoms of Limbuwan to be reunified into Nepal. The King of Gorkha gave the ruler of Ilam full autonomy to rule and the right of Kipat. Ilam was an independent Limbu kingdom until 1813 CE/1869 BS.

Development and culture
Ilam is today one of the developing places in Nepal, even though the Western parts are still struggling with the basic facilities (road networks, drinking water, health, etc.). The migration rate is very low, compared to other districts, due to the adoption of farming by individual families. Ilam Tea, a very famous leaf tea, is one of the finest quality teas in the world and is exported to many parts of Europe, Australia and the USA. The main source of income in this district is commercial agriculture (especially cash crops) like tea, cardamom, ginger, potato, broom grass (Thysanolaena latifolia) production on a large scale and dairy and dairy related products like milk (Olan), cheese, Chhurpi (Traditional hard cheese) and lollipops (local sweets). 

Ilam is also considered to be an educational hub, where students from Ilam, Panchthar, Taplejung and Jhapa are plentiful. There are several institutions that offer secondary, higher secondary and university level programs. For a decade, there has been growing number of technical and vocational programs at secondary and university levels. Mahendra Ratna Multiple Campus, the oldest institution in Ilam, is one of the constituent campuses of Tribhuvan University. The first autonomous campus of Nepal, it is well known for its programs such as Agricultural Science, Education, Humanities and Commerce. The campus launched a Bachelor of Science program in Horticulture in 2012 (B.S. 2069), which has attracted students from all over the Nepal. 

Ilam is well known for its religious importance too. The Devi temples have a great importance attached to them and many people come here just for pilgrimage. The major attraction of Ilam is the nine-cornered Mai Pokhari lake. Also known as the Abode of the Goddess, many tourists as well as Nepalese people come to visit this place. This place is also one of the most famous places for flora and fauna, which attracts biologists. Similarly, Gajurmukhi is also a religious spot for pilgrimages from Nepal and India. The Mai river and its four tributaries also emerge in the Ilam district. Sano Pathivara is another place that is famous for pilgramage. The famous Mane Bhanjyang (Mane pass) connects Ilam with the Darjeeling district of West Bengal, India.

Ilam was in the news a great deal during the Maoist insurgency, as it was from there that Maoists launched frequent, massive attacks.

Tourists going to Ilam can expect to pay around 7000 rupees a week for accommodation and food. People can get easy options for hotel and restaurant facilities of various levels.

Geography and climate

Demographics
At the time of the 2011 Nepal census, Ilam District had a population of 290,254. Of these, 42.8% spoke Nepali, 14.4% Limbu, 8.4% Bantawa, 8.3% Rai, 6.0% Tamang, 4.6% Magar, 2.1% Gurung, 2.1% Newar, 1.2% Sherpa, 1.0% Chamling, 1.0% Sunuwar, 0.9% Lepcha, 0.6% Kulung, 0.5% Sampang, 0.5% Yakkha, 0.4% Thulung, 0.4% Yamphu, 0.3% Bhujel, 0.3% Maithili, 0.3% Mewahang, 0.2% Bote, 0.2% Khaling, 0.2% Yolmo, 0.2% Sanskrit, 0.2% Thami, 0.1% Bhojpuri, 0.1% Dumi, 0.1% Hindi, 0.1% Nachhiring, 0.1% Rajasthani, 0.1% Sam and 1.5% other languages as their first language.

In terms of ethnicity/caste, 23.8% were Rai, 15.8% Limbu, 13.9% Hill Brahmin, 13.6% Chhetri, 7.0% Tamang, 5.2% Magar, 3.7% Newar 3.4% Kami, 2.9% Gurung, 1.6% Damai/Dholi, 1.3% Sunuwar, 1.2% Sherpa, 1.0% Lepcha, 0.7% Gharti/Bhujel, 0.7% Sanyasi/Dasnami, 0.6% Yakkha, 0.5% Yolmo, 0.4% Sarki, 0.3% Thami, 0.2% Kumal, 0.2% Yamphu, 0.1% Bantawa, 0.1% Bhote, 0.1% other Dalit, 0.1% Halwai, 0.1% Kulung, 0.1% Marwadi, 0.1% Musalman, 0.1% Samgpang, 0.1% Teli, 0.1% Thakuri, 0.1% Tharu and 0.6% others.

In terms of religion, 44.5% were Hindu, 35.6% Kirati, 15.3% Buddhist, 2.5% Christian, 1.3% Prakriti, 0.1% Muslim and 0.7% others.

In terms of literacy, 77.7% could read and write, 2.4% could only read and 19.8% could neither read nor write.

Divisions
Ilam is divided into 4 urban and 6 rural municipalities.

Former Village Development Committees and Municipalities

 Amchok
 Banjho
 Barbote
 Chamaita (now deumai municipality)
 Chisapani
 Chulachuli
 Danabari
 Deumai Municipality
 Dhuseni (now Deumai Municipality)
 Ibhang
 Ektappa
 Erautar
 Gajurmukhi
 Ghuseni
 Godak
 Gorkhe
 Jamuna
 Ilam Municipality
 Jirmale
 Jitpur
 Jogmai
 Kolbung
 Lakshmipur
 Lumde
 Mabu
 Mahamai
 Maimajhuwa
 Maipokhari
 Mangalbare (now Deumai Municipality)
 Namsaling
 Naya Bazar
 Pashupatinagar
 Phakphok
 Phuyatappa
 Puwamajhuwa
 Pyang
 Sakphara
 Sakhejung
 Samalbung
 Sangrumba
 Shanti Danda
 Shantipur
 Siddhithumka
 Soyak
 Soyang
 Shree Antu
 Sulubung
 Sumbek
 Suryodaya Municipality

See also
Zones of Nepal
Danabari

References

External links

 

 
Districts of Koshi Province
Districts of Nepal established during Rana regime or before